The Dornier S-Ray 007 is a two-seat amphibious aircraft concept designed by Dornier Technologie.

The concept is similar to that of the Dornier Libelle from the 1920s, and thus originally, the aircraft also carried the name Dornier Libelle. However, it was later changed to Dornier Stingray. Before the first aircraft could be built, the name was changed a third time to the Dornier S-Ray 007.

The flying boat is a high-wing aircraft, featuring a one-piece wing which is connected with the centrally-mounted Rotax 912S engine and propeller, on a stable aerodynamically-shaped central support pylon, to the fuselage. The S-Ray 007 is built from reinforced plastics with carbon fibre reinforcements, which makes the flying boat very resistant to salt water. The aircraft is equipped with retractable landing gear, and two 50 litre fuel tanks.

The maiden flight of the Dornier S-Ray 007 was held on 14 July 2007 at Friedrichshafen airport, and the aircraft was piloted by Gerhard Thalhammer.

Specifications

See also
 Dornier Seastar

References

S-Ray
Flying boats
Amphibious aircraft
Single-engined tractor aircraft
Parasol-wing aircraft
Aircraft first flown in 2007